Rubettes is the third studio album by the English pop band The Rubettes, released on the State Records label in November 1975, their third studio album release within 12 months. It was the last Rubettes album produced by Wayne Bickerton and Tony Waddington.The album contained two UK top 40 hits - Foe Dee O Dee and Little Darling.
In 1992, Dice Records (France) released the Rubettes' third and fourth albums (Rubettes and Sign Of The Times) as a double CD set. In 2015, Caroline Records released the album Rubettes, with three bonus tracks, as part of a box CD set of the Rubettes' first five studio albums.

Track listing
Side 1
"Judy Run Run" (Wayne Bickerton, Tony Waddington) - 3:04
"Little Darling" (Wayne Bickerton, Tony Waddington) - 3:20
"My Buddy Holly Days" (John Richardson, Alan Williams) - 3:15
"Put A Back Beat To That Music" (Wayne Bickerton, Tony Waddington) - 3:39
"It's Better That Way" (John Richardson, Alan Williams) - 3:49
"Play The Game" (Bill Hurd) - 2:59

Side 2
"Foe-Dee-O-Dee" (Wayne Bickerton, Tony Waddington) - 3:01
"I'm Just Dreaming" (Wayne Bickerton, Tony Waddington) - 3:06
"Out In The Cold" (Bill Hurd) - 3:22
"Miss Goodie Two Shoes" (John Richardson, Alan Williams) - 3:41
"When You're Around" (Mick Clarke) - 4:13
"Dark Side Of The World" (Wayne Bickerton, Tony Waddington) - 4:03

2015 CD bonus tracks
Rubettes:
13.  "With You" (John Richardson, Alan Williams) - 2:16
Alan and John*:
14.  "I Still Love You" (John Richardson, Alan Williams) - 4:02
15.  "Love Bonds" (Richardson & Richardson) - 3:18
 *Produced by Alan Blakley

 NB: All track times taken from 2015 CD

Singles
1.  "Foe-Dee-O-Dee" b/w "With You" - June 1975 - UK #15
2.  "Little Darling" b/w "Miss Goodie Two Shoes" - October 1975 - UK #30

Bonus tracks single
 Bonus tracks 14 & 15 were also released as a single:
 "I Still Love You" b/w "Love Bonds" (as Alan and John) - November 1975

Personnel
Mick Clarke
Tony Thorpe
John Richardson
Bill Hurd
Alan Williams

Publishers (including bonus tracks)
Tracks 1, 2, 7 & 8 - Warner Bros Music/Warner Chappell Music/Arlovol Music/Penny Farthing Music
Tracks 3, 4, 5 & 13 - Sony-ATV Music
Tracks 6, 9 & 11 - State Music
Track 10 - Pamscene Ltd/Sony-ATV Music
Track 12 - Arlovol Music/Penny Farthing Music/Warner Bros Music
Tracks 14 & 15 - Halcyon Music

Production and credits
Produced by Wayne Bickerton and Tony Waddington
Engineer - John Mackswith
Assistant Engineer - Super Hugh
Art Direction/Concept - Paul Welch
Front Photography - Sanders
Back Photography - Alec Burn

References

1975 albums
The Rubettes albums
Polydor Records albums